The AARP Movies for Grownups Award for Best Documentary is one of the AARP Movies for Grownups Awards presented annually by the AARP. The award honors the best documentary film from a given year that is made by or focuses on people over the age of 50. The Best Documentary Award is one of the seven original trophies issued by AARP the Magazine, along with awards for Best Movie for Grownups, Best Director, Best Actor, Best Actress, Best Foreign Language Film, and Best Movie for Grownups Who Refuse to Grow Up.

Winners and Nominees

2000s

2010s

2020s

Directors with Multiple Nominations and Wins
The following directors have received multiple nominations for Best Documentary:

References

Documentary
American documentary film awards